Ellery Sprayberry (born October 26, 2000) is an American actress and voice over artist best known for Wakefield, Baskets, The Bronze, and The Young and the Restless.

Early life 
Sprayberry was born and raised in Houston, Texas along with her brother Dylan Sprayberry. She began acting at the age of six after being asked to audition with her brother for commercials and print modeling. Both children relocated to Los Angeles with their parents in 2006 in order to pursue their careers.

Career 
Sprayberry made multiple guest appearances on popular television shows during her early childhood. She was cast in the recurring role of Piper Welch on The Young and The Restless in 2011 for which she was nominated for a Young Artist Award in 2012.

In addition to her on-screen performances, she has worked steadily in voice over in major studio films including Shrek Forever After, Ice Age: A Mammoth Christmas, and The Hunger Games: Catching Fire.

In 2014, she landed the role of Teenage Hope in The Bronze opposite Melissa Rauch, Sebastian Stan, and Gary Cole and attended the film's opening night premiere at the 2015 Sundance Film Festival.

She also co-starred in the film Wakefield opposite Bryan Cranston and Jennifer Garner, released on May 26, 2017, by IFC Films.

In August 2017, she appeared in a guest star role on the MTV series Teen Wolf (on which her older brother Dylan starred as Liam Dunbar).

Sprayberry is an aerialist and frequently performs her own stunts in films and television shows.

Filmography

Film

Television

Awards and nominations 
In 2012, Sprayberry was nominated for Best Performance in a Daytime TV Series by a Young Actress at the Young Artist Awards for her role as Piper Welch on The Young and the Restless.

References

External links 
 

2000 births
Living people
Actresses from Houston
American child actresses
21st-century American actresses
American soap opera actresses
American voice actresses